Oakes Park may refer to:

 Oakes Park, Sheffield, an English country house
 Oakes Park, Niagara Falls, a park in Niagara Falls, Ontario, Canada

See also
Oaks Park